Milan Blagojević  (14 October 1905 – 28/29 October 1941), better known as Španac was a Yugoslav partisan, Spanish-trained commando and republican volunteer in the Spanish Civil War and is credited for initiating the anti-fascist struggle in Yugoslavia during World War II.
Partisan commander Milan Blagojević Španac was killed by the Chetniks in October 1941 in Požega.

See also 
 Milan Blagojević - Namenska
 Blagojević (family name)
 List of military headstamps – Yugoslavia
 Yugoslav volunteers in the Spanish Civil War

References

1905 births
1941 deaths
People from Topola
Serbian people of World War II
Yugoslav Partisans members
Yugoslav communists
Yugoslav military personnel killed in World War II
Yugoslav people of the Spanish Civil War
Recipients of the Order of the People's Hero
International Brigades personnel
People killed by Chetniks during World War II